The Kings of Clonmel is the eighth novel in the Ranger's Apprentice series by Australian author John Flanagan. It was released in Australia on 4 November 2008.

Plot summary
While at the annual Rangers' Gathering, Will is informed by Ranger Commandant Crowley that Ranger Halt will not be able to attend the Gathering as he is investigating happenings in Hibernia, a country to the west of Araluen. The Outsiders, a mysterious religious cult, is gaining followers and stealing gold and jewels. Halt is watching the group, which is acting in Selsey, a small Araluen village. The cult demands gold to build an altar to their god to protect the village and tries to set the village's boats on fire to persuade them into donating more gold. Halt stops their plan and also discovers that the golden altar is a fake. Rather than being solid gold, it is wooden and gold-plated; the cult has been keeping the gold for themselves.

When Halt captures the Outsiders' Selsey leader, he becomes puzzled; the leader recognises him though Halt is sure they have never met. Back at the Ranger's Gathering, Crowley asks Will to take care of three apprentices for a while and tells Will that he is being moved to Redmont Fief to share half the Ranger duties there with Halt. Redmont Fief is where Will grew up, and where his love interest, the diplomat Alyss, and Halt's wife Pauline also live. Will rides to the fief, where he is greeted by a feast made by his childhood friend and cook, Jenny. Halt arrives back in Redmont and tells of what he has seen. Halt reveals the secret of his past; he is the identical twin brother of the King of Clonmel, Ferris. Halt was born first, meaning he was the heir to the throne. He fled Clonmel and joined the Ranger Corps after Ferris repeatedly tried to kill him to obtain the crown for himself. Halt believes the Outsiders leader recognised him as he thought he was Ferris. Crowley assigns Will, Halt, and the knight Horace to investigate the matter in Clonmel. 

The group investigates the Outsiders in Clonmel and works on countering their influence in Clonmel by spreading word of the arrival of the Sunrise Warrior, an old Hibernian legend, as a counter to the Outsiders' religion, and the two Rangers have Horace play the part. As the Sunrise Warrior's name begins to equal that of Outsiders' god in reputation, the trio make for the capital. There, Ferris tells them he made a deal with the Outsiders, so Horace proceeds to knock him out and makes Halt take the king's place. The Outsiders' leader, Tennyson, is furious and challenges Horace to duel his two bodyguards. Horace accepts. Meanwhile, Will is investigating one of the Outsiders' camps, and sees that Tennyson has recruited three foreign men. He notifies Horace and Halt, and Halt immediately identifies them as Genovesans, the most professional assassins in the world, and expects treachery from Tennyson. 

The duel proceeds, with Horace barely winning against the chain and mace used by the first bodyguard. Horace is then drugged by the assassins, causing him to be unable to focus on objects. Will and Halt soon realise this and Halt sends Will back to Horace's tent to retrieve evidence of the drugging. However, he is too late to stop the Genovesan from pouring the water on the ground, but does manage to capture him. He then interrupts Horace's duel by shooting the second bodyguard in the arm, after which he accuses Tennyson of poisoning Horace's water with the testimony of an ice vendor. Tennyson insists Will is lying and Will challenges him to trial by combat, taking on the Genovesan from a range of 200 metres. Despite moving being against the rules of the battle, Will is able to predict the Genovesan's foul play and aims slightly to the side and kills him. The guards then attempt to capture Tennyson but find that he has escaped and has been replaced by an impostor, though not before killing King Ferris. Though Halt is next in line to be king, he chooses to abdicate the throne to his nephew, Sean, who he believes will be a worthy king. At the end of the book, following Horace's recovery, Halt, Will and Horace begin to follow Tennyson's trail once more.

References

External links
 The Kings of Clonmel at Random House Australia
 The King of Clonmel at Random House NZ

Ranger's Apprentice books
2008 Australian novels